Oliver Schweißing (born 3 March 1971) is a German former professional footballer who played as a midfielder.

References

External links
 

1971 births
Living people
German footballers
Association football midfielders
Bundesliga players
2. Bundesliga players
SC Concordia von 1907 players
FC St. Pauli players
VfL 93 Hamburg players
VfB Lübeck players
BV Cloppenburg players
TuS Dassendorf players